Infor is a multinational company  headquartered in New York City that provides industry specific, enterprise software licensed for use on premises or  as a service.

, Infor's software had 58 million users, and 90,000 corporate customers in 200 countries. Those customers include  Bausch & Lomb, Heineken, Wyndham Hotels, Boskalis, EBSCO, Legacy Health and Best Western International.

History

Infor was spun 
out from Malvern, Pennsylvania based Systems & Computer Technology Corp in June 2002, as Agilisys, when there were 1,300 customers of its process manufacturing ERP software. It grew through acquisitions backed by Golden Gate Capital and Summit Partners.

With the addition of Infor Business Solutions AG in 2004, Agilisys changed name to Infor Global Solutions. It relocated headquarters from Alpharetta, Georgia to New York in 2012.

Micro-verticals and cloud

From 2010, Infor marketed "micro-verticals," which were versions of its software adapted for specific industries. It claimed these products were easier to implement than those of its competitors.

Infor introduced an Amazon Web Services based product called CloudSuite in 2014.

Koch Industries

In February 2017, Koch Equity Development LLC invested $2.68 billion in Infor, for a  ownership.

Subsequently, in February 2020, Koch bought out Golden Gate Capital's remaining minority shareholding. The transaction valued Infor's assets at $11 billion.

Acquisitions

Philanthropy
In 2013, the company was recognized as a Computerworld honors laureate for its work with Habitat for Humanity, partnering with the organization to provide software at free or reduced prices. Through Habitat for Humanity, Infor employees also participate in a Volunteer Build Program, Employee Giving Campaign, and Annual Global Village Build.

The company sponsors the Leukemia & Lymphoma Society's “Light the Night Walks” events, held in years such as 2012.

Infor has supported the United Negro College Fund's A Mind Is a Terrible Thing to Waste event.

Awards

 2014 - CODie Awards, Best Healthcare IT Solution
 2014 - CODie Awards, Best Social Business Solution
 2015 - Confirmit Achievement in Customer Excellence Award (for seventh year)
 2015 - Stevie Awards, People's Choice for Favorite New Products
 2016 - Plant Engineering, Energy Performance Management and Maintenance Software Products of the Year

See also

 List of ERP software packages and vendors

References

External links 

 

Privately held companies based in New York City
Software companies based in New York City
ERP software companies
Customer relationship management software companies
American companies established in 2002
Software companies established in 2002
2002 establishments in Pennsylvania
Software companies of the United States
2002 establishments in the United States
Companies established in 2002
Koch Industries